W. James Hatton (born 1897, date of death unknown) was a British long-distance runner who had his best achievements at the 1920 Summer Olympics. He finished fifth in the 10,000 m final and tenth in the 3,000 m race, in which Great Britain won the silver team medal. Hatton did not receive a medal because only three best runners from a team were counted; Hatton was fourth.

Hatton was the Northern Counties champion over 10 miles in 1920 and 4 miles in 1921; he finished second in the 4 miles and fourth in one mile at the 1921 Amateur Athletic Association Championships. The same year, he won the 3 miles at the Kinnaird international meeting and the 4 miles at the Triangular International.

References

1897 births
Date of death missing
British male long-distance runners
Olympic athletes of Great Britain
Athletes (track and field) at the 1920 Summer Olympics